Juho Reinvall (born 24 August 1988) is a Finnish judoka. He competed at the 2016 Summer Olympics in the men's 60 kg event, in which he was eliminated in the second round by Tsogtbaatar Tsend-Ochir.

References

External links
 

1988 births
Living people
Finnish male judoka
Olympic judoka of Finland
Judoka at the 2016 Summer Olympics
European Games competitors for Finland
Judoka at the 2015 European Games